Klagenfurt 2006 was an unsuccessful multi-national bid submitted  by Klagenfurt, Austria and the Austrian Olympic Committee to host the 2006 Winter Olympics. It was one of six candidates, but failed to be short-listed.

The bid planned to use venues placed in Italy and Slovenia. One of the principal motivations was to "demonstrate the unity, harmony, and friendship of a region which has existed and developed as such over centuries, despite changing conditions, separation by political borders and language barriers". The concept was considered to be interesting, but could have resulted in many potential organisational difficulties.

Venues
The proposed venues were located in three countries:

Austria
 Klagenfurt - ceremonies, main olympic village (Valden), women's ice hockey (Klagenfurt Trade Fairs), figure skating, short track, speed skating, curling (temporary ice rink)
 Nassfeld - alpine skiing (men's downhill, the combined downhill and super-G)
 Arnoldstein - alpine skiing (women’s downhill, combined downhill and super-G)
 Hohenthurn-Achomitz - biathlon
 Bad Kleinkirchheim - snowboard

Italy Cluster
 Tarvisio - alpine skiing (women’s slalom, combined slalom and giant slalom), freestyle skiing, cross-country skiing, Nordic combined
 Cortina d'Ampezzo - Eugenio Monti track for bobsleigh, luge, and skeleton

Slovenia Cluster
 Ljubljana - men's ice hockey (two venues: Tivoli Hall and University Hall)
 Kranjska Gora - alpine skiing (men's slalom, combined slalom and giant slalom)
 Planica - ski-jumping, Nordic combined

Aftermath

After selection, Klagenfurt didn't bid for Olympics, but other Austrian town, Salzburg submitted its bid for 2010 Winter Olympics and 2014 Winter Olympics.

Italian Tarvisio previously bid for 2002 Winter Olympics and later became a part of a Klagenfurt 2006 bid, but in the very same IOC session another Italian town, Turin was awarded as a host of 2006 Winter Olympics.

References
Notes

2006 Winter Olympics bids